The Ming Yao Department Store is a department store on Zhongxiao Road, Da'an District, Taipei, Taiwan that opened in April 1987. Main core stores include Nitori, Uniqlo, GU, Junkudō Bookstore, and various themed restaurants.

History

Ming Yao Department Store Co., Ltd. was established in April 1987.
In 1993, the Ming Yao Credit Card was issued with the Union Bank of Taiwan.

In March 2011, the entire department store was closed for renovation.
On September 23, 2011, it was re-opened after modification.

On October 17, 2014, Taiwan's second GU opened on the ground floor.
On July 17, 2020, the Mingyao branch of Junkudō Bookstore on the 9th floor opened. This store is the fourth branch of Junkudō Bookstore in Taiwan.

Gallery

See also
 List of tourist attractions in Taipei

References

External links 

1987 establishments in Taiwan
Buildings and structures in Tainan
Department stores of Taiwan
Commercial buildings completed in 1987
Retail companies established in 1987